Highland is a broad term for areas of higher elevation, such as a mountain range or mountainous plateau.

Highland, Highlands, or The Highlands, may also refer to:

Places

Albania
Dukagjin Highlands

Armenia
Armenian Highlands

Australia
Southern Highlands (New South Wales), usually referred as the Southern Tablelands in New South Wales
Central Highlands (Victoria)
Highlands (Victoria), rural town in Victoria
Central Highlands (Tasmania)
Northern Highlands, usually referred as the Northern Tablelands in New South Wales

Brazil
Brazilian Highlands, the heartland of the country, located on the continental plateau

Canada
Grey Highlands, a municipality in central Ontario near the Green Belt
Highlands, British Columbia, a municipality on Vancouver Island, British Columbia
Highlands, Edmonton, a residential neighbourhood in north east Edmonton, Alberta, Canada
Highlands, Newfoundland and Labrador, a settlement

Iceland
Highlands of Iceland, cover most of the interior of Iceland

Africa
Ethiopian Highlands, mountains in Ethiopia and Eritrea 
The Bamenda Highlands of Cameroon, also known as the Western High Plateau

Papua New Guinea
Eastern Highlands Province
Southern Highlands Province
Western Highlands Province

Thailand
Thai highlands

United Kingdom 
Scottish Highlands, a historic region of Scotland
Highland (council area) and former region
Highland (ward), a council ward in Perth and Kinross

United States

Highland

Highland, Arkansas
Highland, California
Highland, California, a former name of Highland Springs, Lake County, California
Highland, Denver, Colorado, a former town, now a neighborhood in Denver (not to be confused with Highlands, Denver, Colorado)
Highland, Illinois
Highland, Lake County, Indiana
Highland, Vanderburgh County, Indiana
Highland, Vermillion County, Indiana
Highland, Washington County, Indiana
Highland, Iowa
Highland, Kansas
Highland (St. Francisville, Louisiana), listed on the NRHP in Louisiana
Highland, Maryland
Highland (MBTA station), a train station in West Roxbury, Massachusetts
Highland, Minnesota (disambiguation)
Highland, Wright County, Minnesota, an unincorporated community in central Minnesota
Highland, Missouri
Highland, Sullivan County, New York
Highland, Ulster County, New York
Highland, Ohio
Highland, Utah
Highland (James Monroe house), listed on the NRHP in Virginia
Highland, Washington
Highland, Douglas County, Wisconsin, a town
Highland, Iowa County, Wisconsin, a town
Highland, Wisconsin, a village within the town of Highland in Iowa County
The Highland, an NRHP-registered building in Massachusetts

Highlands
Thomas I. Stoner House, a historic house in Des Moines, Iowa, also known as The Highlands
Highlands, Harare, a middle income suburb of Harare, Zimbabwe
Highlands (Smithfield, Kentucky), listed on the NRHP in Kentucky
The Highlands, Louisville, an area in Kentucky
Highlands, Lexington, a neighborhood in northwestern Lexington, Kentucky, United States
The Highlands (Massachusetts), a summit in Barnstable County
Highlands, Holyoke, Massachusetts, a neighborhood in Holyoke, Massachusetts
Highlands, New Jersey
Highlands, New York, the location of West Point
New York–New Jersey Highlands, a range of mountains primarily in Western New Jersey
Highlands, North Carolina, a small town in the western North Carolina mountains
Highlands, Texas
The Highlands (Seattle), a gated community in Washington state
East Renton Highlands, Washington, an unincorporated community, which is sometimes simply called The Highlands
The Highlands (Wheeling, West Virginia), a shopping, dining and entertainment complex
Highlands County, Florida
The Highlands School, in Irving, Texas

See also
Highland Avenue (disambiguation)
Highland Beach (disambiguation)
Highland City, Florida
Highland County (disambiguation)
Highland Heights (disambiguation)
Highland Lake (disambiguation)
Highland Mills, New York
Highland Park (disambiguation)
Highland Plantation, Maine
Highland Springs (disambiguation)
Highland Township (disambiguation)
Highland Village (disambiguation)

Education
Highland Community College (Illinois), a community college in Freeport, Illinois
Highland High School (disambiguation)
Highland Middle School (disambiguation)
Highland School (disambiguation)
Highland School of Technology, Gastonia, North Carolina
Highlands Christian College, Toowoomba, Queensland, Australia
Highlands Elementary School (disambiguation)

Other uses

Highland
Highland (album), by One More Time, 1992
"Highland" (song), the title song
Highland (automobile), an 1890s Australian car
Highland (band), a German dance/hip hop group
Highland (Irish), an Irish musical form
Highland (surname), including a list of people with the name
Highland cattle, a breed of cattle
Highland Park distillery, in the Orkney Islands
Highland Peak (California), a mountain in Sierra Nevada
Highland pony, a breed of horse
Highland Radio, an Irish radio station
Highland Records, a record label
Highland station (disambiguation), stations of the name
Highland Superstores, a defunct American consumer electronics and home appliance chain
Highland, the fictional town that is the setting of Beavis and Butt-Head
SS Highland, a Hansa A Type cargo ship in service 1946-59

Highlands
"Highlands" (song), a 1997 song by Bob Dylan
Highlands (TV series), a Scottish television series produced and broadcast by STV
Aspen Highlands, one of four ski areas near Aspen, Colorado, owned by the Aspen Skiing Company
Highlands Hospital, a former hospital in north London
Highlands (album) by White Heart
Highlands (Metra station), one of three commuter railroad stations along Metra's BNSF Railway line in Hinsdale, Illinois

See also

 
 
 Highlander (disambiguation)
 High (disambiguation)
 Land (disambiguation)